The 5th Lavant Cup was a non-championship Formula Two motor race held at Goodwood Circuit on 6 April 1953. The race was won by Emmanuel de Graffenried in a Maserati A6GCM. Roy Salvadori, starting from pole, finished second in a Connaught Type A-Lea Francis, setting fastest lap in the process. Tony Rolt  was third in another Type A.

Results

References

Lavant Cup
Lavant Cup
Lavant Cup